The 5th Independent Battery Wisconsin Light Artillery  was an artillery battery that served in the Union Army during the American Civil War.

Service
The 5th Independent Battery was mustered into service at Racine, Wisconsin, on October 10, 1861.

The battery was mustered out on June 6, 1865.

Total strength and casualties
The 5th Independent Battery initially recruited 155 officers and men.  An additional 70 men were recruited as replacements, for a total of 225
men.

The battery suffered 1 officer and 5 enlisted men killed in action or died of wounds and 1 officer and 18 enlisted men who died of disease, for a total of 25 fatalities.

Commanders
 Captain Oscar F. Pinney
 Captain Charles B. Humphrey
 Captain George Q. Gardner
 Captain Joseph McKnight

See also

 List of Wisconsin Civil War units
 Wisconsin in the American Civil War

Notes

References
The Civil War Archive

Military units and formations established in 1861
Military units and formations disestablished in 1865
Units and formations of the Union Army from Wisconsin
Wisconsin
1861 establishments in Wisconsin